Herald Froy may refer to:

 Keith Waterhouse, who used the name as a pen name
 Keith Waterhouse and Guy Deghy, who wrote How to Avoid Matrimony and Ninety years of Bohemia under the pen name